Castlefin, sometimes spelt Castlefinn, is a market town and townland in the Finn Valley of County Donegal in Ulster, the northern province in Ireland. It is located between Ballybofey and Lifford in East Donegal and, the population was 705. The River Finn flows by the town. The town is located in along the main N15 national primary road, which runs from Bundoran to Lifford. The town lies 6 miles from Lifford and 8 miles from the twin towns of Ballybofey and Stranorlar. It has close links to Letterkenny, to the twin towns of Ballybofey and Stranorlar, and to West Tyrone in Northern Ireland, especially with the towns of Strabane and Castlederg.

Amenities
The pubs in the town include McBride's, at the foot of the Long Brae beside the main road between Lifford and Ballybofey, as well as Tinney's Bar and Lynch's Tavern (aka Skins).

The five housing estates in the town are called the Emmett Park built in the 1980s Sessaigh Park built in the 2000s, Caislean Court built in the 1990s, Hillhead built in the 1970s and Grahamsland built in the 1950s.

The town centre is located around the Diamond area, which is where three routes merge. The Diamond has landscaped seating and planting areas, and the surrounding area also has a number of buildings that are included on the Record of Protected Structures.
The town has a number of retail, commercial, religious, economic, social and recreational amenities. Castlefinn also serves as a focus of primary education for the surrounding rural areas. The local national school has a large catchment area and currently has 180+ pupils attending. The town also has a pre-school.

The town centre has a number of amenities including retail outlets, grocery stores, a petrol station, post office, butchers, take-aways, public houses and some hairdressers. The town also has a recycling facility that is located on the Castlederg road beside the bridge.

The C.P.I center is used for football, parties, computing and the youth club. Holmes' Coaches is the main transport for the schools, and Castlefinn Cabs and Bus Hire is a local taxi company. There is a local GAA club (Robert Emmetts) and a soccer field (Castlefinn Celtic). Castlefinn is also the home of Finn Valley Radio which broadcasts on 95.8FM locally and online. The station holds a community licence and its studios are located at the CPI Centre.

Schools
Local schools include St Mary's National School, Scoil Náisiúnta Domhnach Mór (Liscooley) and St. Safan's (Scoil Náisiúnta Naomh Samhthann, Drumdoit).

Transport
Castlefinn railway station opened on 7 September 1863, but finally closed on 1 January 1960.

A number of buses pass through Castlefinn on a daily basis going to Letterkenny, Derry, Strabane, Dublin, Sligo and Galway.

Politics
Castlefin is in the Donegal constituency for Dáil elections. There are currently five TDs for this constituency, Pearse Doherty and Padraig MacLochlainn (Sinn Féin), Charlie McConalogue (Fianna Fáil), Thomas Pringle (Independent) and Joe McHugh, (Fine Gael).

The town is in the Lifford-Stranorlar Municipal District for local elections to Donegal County Council. The six Councillors elected to represent the area are Gary Doherty and Liam Doherty  (Sinn Féin), Patrick McGowan and Gerry Crawford (Fianna Fáil), Martin Harley (Fine Gael) and Frank McBrearty (Independent).

Notable people
 Seán Reid, Musician
 Sandy Harper, Donegal GAA 
 Andy Curran, Donegal GAA
 Gary Doherty, Politician 
 Matt McGranaghan, Musician

See also
 List of populated places in the Republic of Ireland

References

External links
Donegal County Council - Castlefinn Local Area Plan

Castlefinn
Castlefinn